Ade Candra Rachmawan (born 3 December 1992) is an Indonesian beach volleyball player from Yogyakarta. Rachmawan won the silver medal at the 2011 Southeast Asian Games partnered with Dian Putra Sentosa. Teamed-up with Koko Prasetyo Darkuncoro, they won the silver medal at the 2013 Islamic Solidarity Games. He and Darkuncoro also competed at the 2014 Asian Games, finished in the fourth position after lost to Chinese pair in the bronze medal match. Rachmawan and Darkuncoro then claimed the gold medal at the 2014 Asian Beach Games in Phuket, Thailand.

In 2017, Rachmawan alongside Mohammad Ashfiya competed at the 2017 World Championships but did not advance to the knockout stage after lost three matches in the group stage. At the 2018 Asian Games in Palembang, Indonesia, he and Ashfiya won the silver medal after lost to Qatari pair in the final.

Achievements

Asian Games 

Men's doubles

Asian Beach Games 

Men's doubles

Asian Youth  Games 

Men's doubles

FIVB Beach Volleyball World Tour 

Key

References

External links
 
 

1992 births
Living people
People from Yogyakarta
Sportspeople from Special Region of Yogyakarta
Indonesian beach volleyball players
Asian Games silver medalists for Indonesia
Asian Games medalists in beach volleyball
Medalists at the 2018 Asian Games
Beach volleyball players at the 2010 Asian Games
Beach volleyball players at the 2014 Asian Games
Beach volleyball players at the 2018 Asian Games
Southeast Asian Games silver medalists for Indonesia
Southeast Asian Games medalists in volleyball
Competitors at the 2011 Southeast Asian Games
Competitors at the 2019 Southeast Asian Games
Southeast Asian Games gold medalists for Indonesia
Islamic Solidarity Games competitors for Indonesia
Competitors at the 2021 Southeast Asian Games
21st-century Indonesian people